The 2001 Hamburg state election was held on 23 September 2001 to elect the members of the 17th Hamburg Parliament. The incumbent coalition government of the Social Democratic Party (SPD) and Green Alternative List (GAL) led by First Mayor Ortwin Runde was defeated. The major change in the election was the entry of the Party for a Rule of Law Offensive ("Schill party") led by Ronald Schill into Parliament with 19.4% of the vote and 25 seats. The Free Democratic Party (FDP) also re-entered Parliament. The Christian Democratic Union (CDU) subsequently formed a coalition with the Schill party and FDP, and CDU leader Ole von Beust was elected as First Mayor.

Parties
The table below lists parties represented in the 16th Hamburg Parliament.

Opinion polling

Election result

|-
! colspan="2" | Party
! Votes
! %
! +/-
! Seats 
! +/-
! Seats %
|-
| bgcolor=| 
| align=left | Social Democratic Party (SPD)
| align=right| 310,362
| align=right| 36.5
| align=right| 0.3
| align=right| 46
| align=right| 8
| align=right| 38.0
|-
| bgcolor=| 
| align=left | Christian Democratic Union (CDU)
| align=right| 223,015
| align=right| 26.2
| align=right| 4.5
| align=right| 33
| align=right| 13
| align=right| 27.3
|-
| bgcolor=|
| align=left | Party for a Rule of Law Offensive (Schill)
| align=right| 165,421
| align=right| 19.4
| align=right| New
| align=right| 25
| align=right| New
| align=right| 20.7
|-
| bgcolor=| 
| align=left | Green Alternative List (GAL)
| align=right| 72,771
| align=right| 8.6
| align=right| 5.3
| align=right| 11
| align=right| 10
| align=right| 9.1
|-
| bgcolor=| 
| align=left | Free Democratic Party (FDP)
| align=right| 43,214
| align=right| 5.1
| align=right| 1.6
| align=right| 6
| align=right| 6
| align=right| 5.0
|-
! colspan=8|
|-
| bgcolor=#2E8B57|
| align=left | Rainbow – For a new left (REGENBOGEN)
| align=right| 14,247
| align=right| 1.7
| align=right| New
| align=right| 0
| align=right| New
| align=right| 0
|-
| bgcolor=|
| align=left | Others
| align=right| 21,638
| align=right| 2.5
| align=right| 
| align=right| 0
| align=right| ±0
| align=right| 0
|-
! align=right colspan=2| Total
! align=right| 850,668
! align=right| 100.0
! align=right| 
! align=right| 121
! align=right| ±0
! align=right| 
|-
! align=right colspan=2| Voter turnout
! align=right| 
! align=right| 71.1
! align=right| 2.4
! align=right| 
! align=right| 
! align=right| 
|}

See also
Hamburg state elections in the Weimar Republic

References

Sources
 The Federal Returning Officer 

2001 elections in Germany
2001 state election
2001
September 2001 events in Europe